General Directorate of the Infrastructural Investment is a Turkish governmental establishment responsible in official transportation investments.

History
The directorate was established during the Ottoman Empire era as a part of Ministry of Public Works (Nafıa Nezareti in Ottoman Turkish). It was responsible in rail road construction and operation. In 1920 the directorate was transferred from İstanbul to Ankara, the newly established capital of Turkey. In 1938, the department of Sea Services which previously had been a part of the Ministry of Economy was merged to the directorate. Next year, the operational services were handed to the relevant establishments in other ministries and the responsibility of the directorate was limited to construction. In 1956 another directorate responsible in airport construction as well as pipelines was established within the same ministry. In 1971, both directorates were merged with. Next year, the name of the directorate was officially declared as Railways, Harbors, Airports and Petroleum Directorate (Demiryolları, Limanlar, Hava Meydanları Genel Müdürlüğü, DLH for short)  Although, the Directorate was divided into three between 1977-1983, it resumed its former status in 1983. However in 1986, the directorate was transferred from The Ministry of Public works to the Ministry of Transport. In 2011 its name was changed to  General directorate of the infrastructural investment (AYGM for short)

Organization
Currently the departments of the directorate are as follows:
Research
Planning
Expropriation
Railroads Survey
Railroads Construction
Harbors Survey
Harbors Construction
Airports Survey
Airports Construction
Electrification
Mechanical
Rail systems
Common services

References

Ministry of Transport and Infrastructure (Turkey)
1971 establishments in Turkey
Organizations based in Ankara
Government agencies established in 1971
Government agencies of Turkey